Mending Wall is the first full-length album by Toronto-based band Chalk Circle. Named after a Robert Frost poem, it was released in 1987 by Duke Street Records.

Many of the album's songs dealt with issues that were big news makers of the day. "This Mourning" dealt with nuclear annihilation, while "N.I.M.B.Y" (Not In My Back Yard) dealt with environmental issues.

A quick reissue of the album featured as an additional track a cover of T-Rex's "20th Century Boy". This was also released as a single. The subsequent reissue of The Great Lake EP in 1988 also featured the track as one of the bonus cuts.

Track listing

CD: Duke Street Records / DSRD-31035 (Canada) 

 "This Mourning"
 "My Artificial Sweetener"
 "What Counts"
 "N.I.M.B.Y."
 "Empty Park"
 "Hands"
 "Park Island"
 "Village"
 "Who Can Say"

CD: Duke Street Records / DSMD-31035 (Canada) 

 "This Mourning"
 "My Artificial Sweetener"
 "What Counts"
 "N.I.M.B.Y."
 "20th Century Boy"
 "Empty Park"
 "Hands"
 "Park Island"
 "Village"
 "Who Can Say"

 1987 reissue adds "20th Century Boy"

Singles 

 "This Mourning"
 "20th Century Boy"
 "N.I.M.B.Y"

1987 albums
Chalk Circle (Canadian band) albums
Duke Street Records albums